The 2011 Liga Sudamericana de Básquetbol, or 2011 FIBA South American League, was the sixteenth edition of the second-tier tournament for basketball teams from South America. The tournament began on 6 October 2011 and finished on 5 February 2012. Argentine club Obras Sanitarias won the tournament, defeating Brazilian club Pinheiros in the Grand Final.

Format
Teams were split into three groups of four teams each and played in a single round-robin format. Each group played all their games in a single host city. The top two teams from each group advanced to the second stage, where two groups of three teams were formed. The top two teams from each group advanced to the semifinals, which consisted of single-elimination playoffs, where the champion was decided. An extra match was played for third place between the losing teams from the semifinals.

Teams

Group stage

Group A

Group B

Group C

Second stage

Group 1

Group 2

Final stage

Bracket

Semifinals

Third place match

Grand Final

References

2011 South American League for Men's Clubs, FIBA Archive. Retrieved 22 May 2018.

Liga Sudamericana
2011